The 2022 Big 12 Conference softball tournament was held at USA Softball Hall of Fame Stadium in Oklahoma City, Oklahoma from May 12 through May 14, 2022. As the tournament winner, Oklahoma State earned the Big 12 Conference's automatic bid to the 2022 NCAA Division I softball tournament.

Format
All seven teams will be seeded based on conference winning percentage.  They then will play a single-elimination tournament, with the top seed receiving a bye.

Bracket

Schedule

References

Big 12 Conference softball tournament
Tournament
Big 12 softball tournament